A bipin or bi-pin (sometimes referred to as two-pin, bipin cap or bipin socket) is a type of lamp fitting.  They are included in the IEC standard "IEC 60061 Lamp caps and holders together with gauges for the control of interchangeability and safety". They are used on many small incandescent light bulbs (especially halogen lamps), and for starters on some types of fluorescent lights.

Some sockets have pins placed closer together, preventing the low-power bulbs they use from being replaced by bulbs that are too high power, which may generate excessive heat and possibly cause a fire.  These are sometimes called "mini-bipin".  Where the terminals of the lamp are bent back onto the sides of the base of the bulb, this forms a wedge base, often used in small bulbs for automotive lighting.

The bi-pin base was invented by Reginald Fessenden for the 1893 World's Fair in Chicago.  After Westinghouse won the contract to wire and illuminate the first electrified fair with AC instead of arch-rival Thomas Edison's DC, Edison and his General Electric company refused to allow his patented Edison screw-base bulbs to be used.  Westinghouse overcame this by developing the bi-pin base for use at the fair. An incandescent electric lamp with a bi-pin base was patented by the Westinghouse (G. Westinghouse, Jr.) in 1895.

Types

The suffix after the G indicates the pin spread; the G dates to the use of Glass for the original bulbs.  GU usually also indicates that the lamp provides a mechanism for physical support by the luminaire: in some cases, each pin has a short section of larger diameter at the end (sometimes described as a "peg" rather than a "pin"); the socket allows the bulb to lock into place by twisting it; in others, the base of the lamp has a groove which can be held by a spring or clip.

A lowercase "q" at the end of the designation indicates that it is a quad-pin base, with two bi-pin pairs.  These are used with compact fluorescent tubes that plug into a light fixture that has a permanent ballast.

There are also double-ended halogen and fluorescent tubes with one pin at each end, and high-output fluorescents with recessed or shrouded contacts, which are not covered here.

See also
 Bayonet mount
Fluorescent-lamp formats
Fluorescent lamp
 Multifaceted reflector (MR)

References

External links
 
Cross-reference for EU/US

Types of lamp
Electrical power connectors
Mechanical standards